Contact protection methods are designed to mitigate the wear and degradation occurring during the normal use of contacts within an electromechanical switch, relay or contactor and thus avoid an excessive increase in contact resistance or switch failure.

Contact wear

Every time the contacts of an electromechanical switch, relay or contactor are opened or closed, there is a certain amount of contact wear.  The sources of the wear are high current densities in microscopic areas, and the electric arc.  Contact wear includes material transfer between contacts, loss of contact material due to splattering and evaporation, and oxidation or corrosion of the contacts due to high temperatures and atmospheric influences.

While a pair of contacts is closed, only a small part of the contacts are in intimate contact due to asperities and low-conductivity films.  Because of the constriction of the current to a very small area, the current density frequently becomes so high that it melts a microscopic portion of the contact.  During the close-to-open (break) transition, a microscopic molten bridge forms and eventually ruptures asymmetrically, transferring contact material between contacts and increasing the surface roughness.  This can also occur during the open-to-close (make) transition due to contact bounce.

The electric arc occurs between the contact points (electrodes) both during the transition from closed to open (break) and from open to closed (make) when the contact gap is small and the voltage is high enough.  Heating due to arcing and high current density can melt the contact surface temporarily.  If some of the melting material solidifies while the contacts are closed, the contact may stick closed due to a micro-weld, similar to spot welding.

The arc caused during the contact break (break arc) is similar to arc welding, as the break arc is typically more energetic and more destructive.  The arc can cause material transfer between contacts.  The arc may also be hot enough to evaporate metal from the contact surface.

The high temperatures can also cause the contact metals to more rapidly oxidize and corrode.

Contacts reach end of life for one of two reasons.  Either the contacts fail to break because they are stuck (welded) closed, or the contacts fail to make (high resistance) because of contact corrosion or because excessive material is lost from one or both contacts. These conditions are the result of cumulative material transfer during successive switching operations, and of material loss due to evaporation and splattering.

There are additional mechanisms for stuck closed failures, such as mechanical interlocking of rough contact surfaces due to contact wear.

Protection

The degradation of the contacts can be limited by including various contact protection methods.

One method is to add electronic components such as: capacitors, snubbers, diodes, Zener diodes, transient voltage suppressors (TVS), resistors, varistors or in-rush current limiters (PTC and NTC resistors). However, this is the least effective method as these neither significantly influence the creation of nor suppress the arc between the contacts of electromechanical power switches, relays and contactors.

A slightly more effective method is to make the contacts themselves larger, i.e., a contactor.

A similar method to increasing contact size is to make the contacts out of more durable metals or metal alloys such as tungsten.

The most effective methods are to employ arc suppression circuitry including arc suppressors, solid state relays, hybrid power relays, mercury displacement relays and hybrid power contactors.

See also
 Arc suppression
 Contact resistance
 Wetting current
 Wetting voltage

References

Switches
Power engineering
Electric arcs